John Potts (c. 1710 – 6 June 1768) was the founder of the town of Pottstown, Pennsylvania. He was also an ironmaster, merchant, and English Quaker.

John Potts, oldest son of Thomas and Martha (Keurlis) Potts, was born about 1710, probably in Philadelphia. He married Ruth Savage, daughter of Samuel and Ann (Rutter) Savage, on 11 April 1734. The marriage was accomplished after the manner of Friends, though not under their care or jurisdiction. John and Ruth had the following children: Thomas, b. 1735, Samuel, b. 1736; John, b. 1738; Martha, b. 1739–40; David, b. 1741; Joseph, b. 1742; Jonathan, b. 1745; Anna, b. 1747; Isaac, b. 1750; James, b. 1752; Rebeccah, b. 1755; Jesse, b. c. 1757; Ruth, b. 1759.

John Potts, like his father, was an enterprising businessman, and for many years was the largest and most successful iron-master in the American Colonies, operating mines, furnaces and forges in Pennsylvania and Virginia. He long filled the office of Justice of the Peace, and was also a Judge of the Court Common Pleas.

In 1752, he purchased two tracts of land at the confluence of the Manatawny Creek and Schuylkill River, aggregating nearly 1,000 acres. There he laid out the town of Pottstown.

Pottsgrove Manor
In 1752, Potts built a Georgian style home, Pottsgrove Manor, in Pottstown, which was added to the National Register of Historic Places in 1974. The house has been restored and is now an 18th-century historic house museum owned by Montgomery County.

References

External links
History of Pottstown
Pottsgrove Manor
About Pottsgrove Manor
About Pottsgrove Manor at about.com

People of colonial Pennsylvania
1710 births
Year of death unknown
1768 deaths
Colonial American merchants
18th-century Quakers